Hayatabad-e Majidi (also Romanized as Ḩayātābād-e Majīdī) is a village in Tashan-e Sharqi Rural District, Tashan District, Behbahan County, Khuzestan Province, Iran. At the 2006 census, its population was 305, in 59 families.

References 

Populated places in Behbahan County